Bootle Athletic Football Club was an association football club from Bootle, Lancashire. Formed in 1948 they competed in the Lancashire Combination, winning the Second Division and from then on competing in the First Division, until their demise in 1953, when they resigned from the league and folded.

They played their games at Hawthorne Road, previously the home of the professional Bootle, briefly members of the Football League from 1892 to 1893. They moved to Bootle Stadium in 1950 until their demise in 1953.

References

Defunct football clubs in England
Defunct football clubs in Lancashire
Defunct football clubs in Merseyside
Association football clubs established in 1948
Association football clubs disestablished in 1953
Lancashire Combination
1948 establishments in England
1953 disestablishments in England
Sport in the Metropolitan Borough of Sefton